The red-throated woodlizard (Enyalioides rubrigularis) is a species of reptile in the genus Enyalioides, native to Ecuador.

References

Reptiles described in 2009
Reptiles of Ecuador
Lizards of South America
Enyalioides
Endemic fauna of Ecuador
Taxa named by Omar Torres-Carvajal
Taxa named by Kevin de Queiroz
Taxa named by Richard Emmett Etheridge